Sebastian Fakt (born July 25, 1995) is a Swedish ice hockey player. He is currently playing with Almtuna IS of the HockeyAllsvenskan.

Fakt made his Swedish Hockey League debut playing with Leksands IF during the 2013–14 SHL season.

References

External links

1995 births
Living people
Aalborg Pirates players
Leksands IF players
Swedish ice hockey forwards